Aljaž Cotman (born 26 April 1994) is a Slovenian footballer who plays as a goalkeeper. He was a member of the Slovenian youth national teams.

Club career
Cotman started his career in his hometown club Triglav from Kranj. He joined the youth ranks of English Premier League side Wolverhampton Wanderers in 2010, signing a professional deal in 2012. However, he did not make an appearance for the senior team before his contract expired and he returned to his homeland.

On 21 October 2013, he joined the Slovenian champions Maribor. He made his Maribor debut in a cup match against Šenčur on 13 November 2013, where his team won the game 5–2. He made his fully professional debut in the Slovenian PrvaLiga on 17 May 2014 in a match against Gorica.

International career
Cotman was capped for Slovenia at all youth levels from under-15 to under-21.

Notes

References

External links
NZS profile 

1994 births
Living people
Sportspeople from Kranj
Slovenian footballers
Association football goalkeepers
Slovenian expatriate footballers
Expatriate footballers in England
Slovenian expatriate sportspeople in England
Wolverhampton Wanderers F.C. players
NK Maribor players
NK Aluminij players
NK Nafta Lendava players
Slovenian PrvaLiga players
Slovenian Second League players
Slovenia youth international footballers
Slovenia under-21 international footballers